Joan Elizabeth Hansen (born July 18, 1958) is a retired long-distance runner from the United States, who represented her native country in the women's 3,000 metres at the 1984 Summer Olympics in Los Angeles, California, finishing in eighth place. Her twin, Joy Hansen Leutner, is a triathlete.

References

 ARRS
 USA Olympic Team

1958 births
Living people
American female long-distance runners
Athletes (track and field) at the 1984 Summer Olympics
Olympic track and field athletes of the United States
21st-century American women